The men's 4 × 320 metres relay event at the 1975 European Athletics Indoor Championships was held on 8 March in Katowice. The athletes ran two laps for each leg, like in modern indoor relay races, but because the track was only 160 metres long, it resulted in an unusual distance of 320 metres for each runner.

Results

References

4 × 400 metres relay at the European Athletics Indoor Championships
Relay